Jannes is a Dutch and Low German masculine given name derived from Johannes. Jannes or Jamnes is also the name traditionally given to an Egyptian sorcerer mentioned without a name in the Book of Exodus.

Jannes Horn (born 1997), German footballer
Jannes Kirsten (born 1993), South African rugby player
Jannes Pieter Mazure (1899–1990), Dutch Labour Party politician, President of the Senate
Jannes Munneke (born 1949), Dutch rower
Jannes Vansteenkiste (born 1993), Belgian footballer
Jannes van der Wal (1956–1996), Dutch world champion draughts player

See also
Janne, given name in Nordic countries
Joannes

Dutch masculine given names